Ashlyn is the eponymous debut studio album by American singer and songwriter Ashe. It was released by Mom + Pop Music on May 7, 2021. Its subject matter centers on Ashe's experiences with divorce, emotional abuse, and grief, including the passing of her brother due to an overdose in September 2020.

Composition 
Primarily, the album is a pop record, with influences of music from the 1970s, including artist like Carole King, Elton John and Neil Young, as her biggest musical referents. Prior to the release of Ashlyn, Ashe commented that the album is "deeply reflective and honest, full of stories of my experiences with fear and pain and turning those hard things into joy and independence". Chris DeVille of Stereogum described the album's composition as being "steeped in ornate arrangements and classic sounds".

Critical reception 

Jem Aswad of Variety opined that "it's a whale of a debut album from a giant young talent".

Commercial performance 
The album debuted at number 194 on the US Billboard 200, making it Ashe's second entry on the chart. It also peaked at number two on the Billboard Heatseekers chart.

Track listing

Charts

References 

2021 debut albums
Mom + Pop Music albums
Ashe (singer) albums